Legouvé is a surname, and may refer to:

Jean-Baptiste Legouvé (1729-1783)
Gabriel-Marie Legouvé (1764-1812), French poet, son of J. B.
Ernest Legouvé (1807-1903), French dramatist, son of Gabriel-Marie
Also See:
Ernest Legouve Reef